The George E. Davis Medal is a medal of the IChemE given not more frequently than every three years, for achievements in chemical engineering.  It is named after George E. Davis.

Davis medallists 
Source:  IChemE

 1965 - Arthur Joseph Victor Underwood (1897-1972), consulting chemical engineer
 1969 - Frank E. Ireland, Chief Alkali Inspector
 1973 - J. M. Coulson
 1977 - Sir Denis Rooke
 1982 - Sir Maurice Hodgson
 1988 - Sir Geoffrey Allen
 1991 - Jacques Villermaux
 1998 - Ian Robinson, CEO, Scottish Power
 2001 - Sir David Harrison
 2004 - Sir David King
 2011 - Andrew N. Liveris
 2016 - Roland Clift

See also
List of engineering awards
List of chemistry awards
List of prizes named after people

References

British awards
Chemical engineering awards
Awards established in 1865